Raorchestes gryllus is a species of frog in the family Rhacophoridae. It is found in Laos and Vietnam. Its natural habitat is shrubby vegetation.
It is presumably threatened by habitat loss.

References

External links
 

gryllus
Amphibians of Laos
Amphibians of Vietnam
Amphibians described in 1924
Taxonomy articles created by Polbot